Anne Keothavong and Anna Smith were the defending champions, but both players chose not to participate.

Stéphanie Foretz Gacon and Kristina Mladenovic won the title, defeating Julie Coin and Eva Hrdinová in the final, 6–0, 6–4.

Seeds

Draw

References 
 Main Draw

Open Gdf Suez Nantes Atlantique - Doubles